Kamp-e Sad Lar (also Romanized as Kamp-e Sad Lār; also known as Sadd-e Daryācheh-ye Lār, Sadd-e Lār, and Ta’sīsāt-e Khadamātī-ye Sadd-e Lār) is a village in Bala Larijan Rural District, Larijan District, Amol County, Mazandaran Province, Iran. At the 2006 census, its population was 187, in 62 families.

References 

Populated places in Amol County